T.SUMATHY (a) THAMIZHACHI THANGAPANDIAN - Tamiḻacci Taṅkapāṇṭiyaṉ is well known Indian Politician,  Tamil Poet, Lyricist, Orator, Writer and Performing Artist.  She is the daughter of V. Thangapandian (died 31 July 1997), an Indian politician, then Minister for Cooperation, DMK party district secretary (Aruppukottai) and Member of the Legislative Assembly of Tamil Nadu from Aruppukottai constituency. Thangam Thennarasu the Minister for Department of Industries, Tamil Official Language, Tamil Culture and Archelogy Minister of Tamil Nādu is her brother.

At present, she is a Member of Parliament representing DMK Party of 17th Lok Sabha. She was elected to the Lok Sabha, lower house of the Parliament of India, from Chennai South constituency in the 2019 Indian general election. She worked as a lecturer in English at Queen Mary's College before dipping into politics.

Early Life 
Thamizhachi born as the eldest daughter of Mr. V. Thangapandian M.A., B.Ed., then the School Head Master who’s a staunch member of DMK from 1949 - right from the dawn of the party and Mrs. Rajamani a school Teacher in Mallankinaru, Ramanathapuram District, Tamil Nadu. She did her Primary education in Mallankinaru. Reminiscent of her childhood, she always hails her brought up in Mallankinaru. She frequently visit her hometown and keeping her root alive.
Now she is living in Tamil Nadu, Chennai, Neelankarai, closer to the Sea in her constituency.

Education and Alma Matter 
Completing her primary education in Mallankinaru, she did her high school in Virudhunagar which is the nearby town from Mallankinaru. Accomplishing her Bachelor of Arts - English Literature in Sri Meenakshi College for Women in Madurai, did Masters (of Arts) in the same faculty in Thiagarajar College of Arts & Science, Madurai Kamaraj University, Madurai. She was an ardent student and Holds University Rank in her Masters Degree). Continued and completed her Masters in Philosophy (M. Phil.,) in English Literature in same College cum University.
As a research scholar, she was the recipient of the AIC (Australia – India Council) Fellow Award (2004). Later she was awarded Doctorate for her research on  – Diasporic Longing and The Changing Contours of Resistance in The Plays of Ernest Thalayasingham Macintyre from University of Madras, Chennai in the year 2010.

Academic Career 
Like her parents started her career as Lecturer. She served in various colleges before shifting her complete focus into Politics.
Worked as Lecturer in the Department of English as below

Academic Activities 

Beyond her teaching her academic interest were branching out in different educational areas.

Political Career

Legacy
T.Sumathy (a) Thamizhachi Thangapandian hails from a political family from South India - (Virudhunagar). Her father Mr.V.Thangapandian, has been a staunch member of DMK from 1949 - right from the dawn of the party,who quit his academic career as the Headmaster of a High School to become the Member of the Legislative Council, (chosen by the founder of the DMK Paeraningar Anna). Under the leadership of the great Leader Dr. Kalaignar Karunanidhi, he had an active political career - as the DMK District Secretary of Virudhunagar for Twenty Seven Years (27 yrs), Member of Legislative Assembly (MLA) and Minister for Co-operation and then Minister for Commercial Tax. While he held Chair as the Minister for Commercial Tax in the then DMK Government he demised suddenly on July 31st (1997).
Her younger brother Mr.Thangam Thennarasu B.E. (worked in SPIC for nine years) made his entry into politics as the candidate for by - election in Arupukottai Constituency, which fell vacant due to his father’s demise. Twice an M.L.A., he was the Minister for School Education in the cabinet of Late Kalaignar Karunanidhi (from 2006 - 2011). Currently he serves as the sitting MLA for Thiruchuli Constituency (Virudhunagar District).
Initiated by her father, the Philanthropic activities done by her family, the family has a strong presence in Virudhunagar and Arupukottai constituency.
From her childhood she got chance to observe prominent DMK leaders like Dr. M. Karunanidhi  Following her father’s footstep she quit her academic career to foray into politics by hoisting the prestigious party flag at the DMK Party’s Youth Wing State Conference on December 2007.

Party activity
She’s the prominent Party speaker for DMK. Political campaign she did for Mr. Thangam Thennarasu was well received and helped in winning with leading margin. 
DMK under the able Leadership of its Leader Mr. M.K.Stalin recogonized Thamizhachi Thangapandian by appointing her as active Deputy President for the Art, Literature and Rationality Wing of the DMK.

As Member of Parliament 
2019
In the year 2019 she contested the Indian general election, 2019 Lok Sabha elections as a candidate from Chennai South Chennai South (Lok Sabha constituency). representing DMK. She won the election Member of Parliament, 17th Lok Sabha.
securing 5,64,872 votes defeating the active MP J. Jayavardhan of AIADMK Party by 2,62,223 votes difference.

Maiden Speech : https://www.youtube.com/watch?v=RxfDu1AS2DM

Literature
She is an admired Tamil poet, and her areas of interest includes post – colonial literatures (especially Sri Lankan and Australian), diasporic literatures (especially Sri Lankan Tamil Diaspora), translation, criticism.
Published Books

Translation of her Works

The five volumes of poems of Tamiḻacci Taṅkapāṇṭiyaṉ - Eñcōṭṭuppeṇ (2003), Vaṉappēcci (2007), Mañcaṇatti (2009), Arukaṉ (2011), and Avaḷukku Veyil Eṉṟu Peyar (2015) - should be more than enough to demonstrate that the first two decades of the twently - first century could produce in Tamil a poet with a difference. When, in the name of ‘putukkavitai’ (new poetry), a large number of titbits, witticisms and verbal cartoons were turned out by those who could not write good prose without mistakes in grammar and expression, and when ‘traditional’ poetry was unjustly held in contempt, contemporary Tamil literary scene witnessed the arrival of one who, differing from the two groups, could carve out a refreshingly original poetic career for herself. - says Prof. P.Marudhanayagam in his book Tamil Poetry - Since Bharathi.

In general Thamizhachi’s Poems are seen to address three major donnes or subjects: i)life in a rooted environment with all its hardships and companionship, now slowly disappearing as villages get demorphed with the march of forms of economic development and global mono culture and on the obverse the alienation so keenly felt in urban existence by someone so used to organic living open to nature, and the living presence of the environment, ii) the asymmetrical relationship between man and  woman in our society, iii) loss of respect for human life in war and conflict situations in contemporary political scenario. - remarks C.T.Indra in her translation of Thamizhachi’s poems into English titled as Internal colloquies.

The urban life represented in these stories titled as Muttu Veedu bring alive, not only the vagaries of an inconsequential existence, but also the extraordinary moments in the lives of ordinary individuals. - observes V.Bharathi Harishankar in her translation of Thamizhachi’s anthology of short stories titled as Birthing Hut and Other Stories.

Literary Activities 

Presented a paper on the Study of Australian Tamils (Tamil Migrants from Srilanka) at the International Conference: Culture, Literature and Translation at the University of Madras, 2001

Translated and read out in English, the Tamil Short Stories of Prabanjan and Arun Vijayarani at the International Conference: Culture, Literature and Translation at the University of Madras, 2001

Organized an International Tamil Literary Conference Tamil Elakkiam 2004 on January 10th and 11th 2004, Chennai, in which 26 books of reputed Tamil writers were published.  (16 books are from various Tamil writers from Australia, Denmark, Canada and France)Presented a Paper at the same Literary Conference on “Tamil Literature towards New Directions” on 10.01.2004 at Chennai.  Launched My poetry collection Enjottu Penn in Sydney on 28.08.2004 by the Sydney Tamil Literary Association.Addressed a Literary Meeting in Melbourne in September 2004, where Enjottu Penn was introduced and discussed, organized by the Tamil Writers Association, Melbourne.

Invited as Guest speaker for a three day Conference Organized by FeTNA (Federation of North American Tamils) from July 5 – 8, 2012 at Baltimore, USA. 

Invited to Present poems in an All India Poets Meet organized by TIASCI – Paris, France on July’13. 

Launched the book Island to Island at Sorbonne University, Paris, France on 06.07.2013.

Invited as a Guest of Honour to participate as a guest lecturer making part of the project “REACTIV-ARTE” – funded by the Xunta de Galicia (Galician Autonomous Government) and organized by NGO Implicadas no Desenvolvemento – held in Galicia from April 6th to April 15th, 2015. My poems were translated into Galician language and read out at the Galician Writers Forum – A Coruna and at the Feminist Forum- Santiago de Compostela.

Invited as a Chief Guest for Pongal Celebrations by the Muzhumathy Foundation - Japan (Tokyo) - on February’ 17.

Invited as a Guest of Honour by the Readers Forum - Singapore, on March’ 17.
Performing Arts

Theatrical Activities	:	

Thamizhachi's role in the play based on Bharathiyar’s Poetry directed by renowned Tamil Writer Mr.Prasanna Ramasamy gained a lot of attraction and was staged at Kalakshetra and Chennai Book Fair. She has also participated in his plays based on Cheran and Sugumaran’s poems.

She acted in the two-hour-long play Kurinchi Pattu written by the renowned poet Inkulab under the direction of A.Mangai, a noted dramatist in the field of Tamil drama. The play was widely regarded as an attempt to resurrect long-suppressed traditions and legendary cultural roots and was staged in Chennai and Salem. 

On behalf of ‘VELI’ Rangarajan’s theatre group, she acted as Akaligai in the Akaligai play of the legendary Tamil writer K.P.Ra at the Chennai Alliance Francis Theater. The play was lauded for its modern feminist voice.

She has also acted as Surpanagai in Ku.Alagirisamy’s Vanjamagal, a modern play staged at the Chennai University Tamil Department and was well received.

She enacted in the role of Menakai in Muruval a drama written by famous Sri Lankan Tamil writer S.Ponnudurai. The drama was staged in Chennai Naradha Ghana Sabha under the direction of Thiru.Prasadh. 

She staged a modern Tamil play called Innoru Etho with Siresu, a Sri Lankan Tamil writer based in Canada.

She performed in a play directed by Jayarao staged in collaboration with a theatre group called Theatre Lab at Alliance Francis, Chennai. The play was based on G.Krishnamurthy's Tamil translation of Mahatma Gandhi's Last Five Seconds. And the play was praised for its voice of peace against power.

In all the book releases of Thamizhachi Thangapandian, her poems in the form of plays are being performed by the Mundram Arangu theatre group under the purview of celebrated theatre artist Thiru.Karuna Prasadh as prologues.

Film career

As a lyricist

As a Dialogue writer
She has written the dialogues for the movie Paris Paris which is ready for release this summer.

Awards and Recognition

Academic Awards and Scholarships	: 	General Proficiency Award – Under Graduation (B.A., English Literature)Proficiency awards in Drama and Dance – Under Graduation (B.A., English Literature)Proficiency Award – Faculty of Languages, Sriniketan, Madras.University Rank Holder : Gold Medallist – Madurai Kamaraj University – Post Graduation (M.A., English Literature)FELLOWSHIP FOR THE STUDY OF AUSTRALIA – 2004, by the Australia India Council. As an AIC FELLOW – 2004, visited Australia from August – November 2004, as part of my Doctoral ResearchDr. Vedagiri Shanmugasundaram Awarded for the successful Ph.D Scholar of the Research Departments of the Ethiraj College  for Women, Chennai.

Literary, Cultural Awards and Recognition	:	Enjottu Penn has been awarded Sirpi Literary Prize, 2004 and Mahakavi Bharathiar Award, 2005.  

Selected poems from Enjottu Penn have been prescribed for Tamil Literature Students at Nandanam Arts College, Loyola College, Ethiraj College for Women & Women’s Christian College in Chennai. Enjottu Penn as a whole collection has been included in Periyar University (Salem) - Tamil Literature (Post Graduation) Syllabus (2017 - 2020). Vanapechi as a whole collection has been included in Nirmala Womens College (Autonomous), Coimbatore - Tamil Literature (Under Graduation) Syllabus (2018).Kavingnar Thirunal Virudhu, Awarded 2007.

Vanapechi has been awarded Aelathi Illakia Virudhu, 2008 and Tirupoor Tamil Sanga Virudhu, 2009.Young Achiever Trophy in Theatre Awarded by Wisdom Publications.Tamil Nadu Iyal Isai Nadaga Mandram (Kalai Panpattu Thurai) for Best Performing Artist in Kurinjipattu Theatrical Drama on 24.12.2006

The prestigious Pavendhar Bharathidasan Virudhu – 2009 by the Tamil Nadu State Government. 

A Citation given by University of Madras for Advancing the cause of women in the field of Literature on International Women's Day - 2010.Best Poet Virudhu, 2010 by Kalam Puthithu, a Literary Organisation for Little Magazines, at Virudhachalam, Tamil Nadu.Ilakkiya Alumai Virudhu, 2011 by Rajapalayam Tamil SangamCarolina Tamil Sangam Award by Tamil Sangam of Carolina, Inc., 14, July, 2012 Kalaignar Porkizhi Award, 2013 by BAPASSI for contribution to Tamil Poetry. K. Sivathambi Award for Thanimai Thalir Article which was published in Kanayazhi Monthly Magazine at Kanaizhai Ponvizha & Virudhu Vizha 2015. Bharathi Pani Selvar Award, 2015 by Bharathiyar Sangam at Bharathiyar Vizha, Chennai. 

A one-day National Seminar on Thamizhachi’s poetry and works was organised by the Madurai Dhiraviyam Thayumanavar Hindu College at Tirunelveli, Tamil Nadu, South India on 27.10.2010.  Ph.D Scholars, Research Students and eminent critics have participated and submitted papers on her poetry. 

Award for Performing Arts :Wisdom Magazine's Best Young Playwright Award for excellence in Performing Arts

Societal Awards		:Certificate of Honour – UNICEF – for contribution towards – Baby Friendly Initiative.Certificate of Appreciation by Tamil Nadu Government for donating Blood on December 2004Bharathi Award by Vidiyal Foundation on March’17Crown Jewel of Social Activities Award by Madras Development Society, 
Chennai on April’ 17Thara Bharathi Award by Kavimugil Foundation on June’ 17.Justice M.M.Ismail Memorial Award by Kamban Kazhagam, Chennai on August’ 17Pride of India Award by SPARRC - IISM (Indian Institute of Sports Medicine) from His 
Excellency ESL. Narasimhan, Hon. Governor Telangana & Andhra Pradesh on 17.02.2018.Eminent Citizen Award by Rotary Club of Madras North - Golden Jubilee Celebrations on Ocotober’18CLR - Best Woman Writer Award by Pachyderm Tales on September’ 21Homepreneur Awards - Inspiring Politician by Sakthi Masala & Brand Avatar Groups on September’ 21Iconic Woman Award by Rotary Club of Madras-3232, TNagar, Chennai on August’ 22Shakthi Award by Rotary Club of Madras'', Teynampet, Chennai on August’ 22

Elections Contested and Results

References

External links 
 Tamizhachi Thangapandian-IMDB
Official biographical sketch in Parliament of India website
 Thamizhachi Thangapandian Personal Website

Tamil poets
Living people
Tamil-language lyricists
Indian writers
1962 births
Indian politicians
Tamil Nadu politicians